The 2019 Judo Grand Prix Tashkent was held in Tashkent, Uzbekistan, from 20 to 22 September 2019.

Medal summary

Men's events
Source:

Women's events
Source: 

Source Results

Medal table

References

External links
 

2019 IJF World Tour
2019 Judo Grand Prix
Judo